The Baker and the Beauty is an Indian Telugu-language romantic comedy-drama web series directed by Jonathan Edwards. An adaptation of Israeli television series Beauty and the Baker, it is produced by Supriya Yarlagadda and stars Santosh Sobhan, Tina Shilparaj, Venkat, Rajiv kumar Aneja and Vishnu Priya in the lead roles. Season 1 of the series was premiered on 10 September 2021 on Aha.

Synopsis

Cast 

Santosh Sobhan as Vijay "Vijju" Krishna Dasaripalle
Tina Shilparaj as Aira Vasireddy
Venkat as Lakshmi
Rajiv Kumar Aneja as Gogo Katyal
Vishnu Priya as Maheswari
Jhansi as Padma Dasaripalle; mother of Vijay
Sai Swetha as Meera Dasaripalle
Sangeeth Shobhan as Vikram Krishna Dasaripalle
Srikanth Iyyengar as Venkateshwarlu Dasaripalle; father of Vijay
Tarusha Saxena as Suseela Aunty
Kamakshi as Smrithi
Pavani as Melissa D'Souza
Sonakshi as Soumya
Sai Kiran as Madhu
Zainil as Kabir
Avinash as Gourav
Abhishek Maharshi as Govardhan
Priyansha as Priya
Siri Raasi as Divya
Rakesh as Chanti

Episodes

Season 1

Reception 
Sangeetha Devi Dundoo of The Hindu called it as a "faithful adaption" of its original. She compared it with 2018 Telugu film Sammohanam and 1999 American film Notting Hill. Another citic of 123Telugu gave a rating of 3 out of 5 and wrote that "The Baker And The Beauty banks on the subtle emotions that are evoked through the unlikely love track between the lead pair. But the emotional connect subdues towards the end, which doesn’t help the cause. Nevertheless, the series can make for a decent one-time watch."

References

External links 
 
The Baker and The Beauty at Aha

2021 web series debuts
Aha (streaming service) original programming
Telugu-language web series
Indian comedy web series
Indian television series based on non-Indian television series
2021 Indian television series debuts
Indian romance television series